Lëvizja Vetëvendosje ('Self-determination movement') (LVV) is a centre-left to left-wing political party in Kosovo. It is orientated towards principles of social democracy, populism, and Albanian nationalism.

Vetëvendosje was founded in 2005 as a grassroots, anti-establishment movement and as a successor of the Kosova Action Network (KAN) and participated in elections for the first time in 2010. The movement widely bases its ideology on the works of Ukshin Hoti. Vetëvendosje campaigns for social and political change based on the principles of equality, democracy, political freedom and social justice for every citizen. The program of Vetëvendosje focuses on three main axes: meritocracy, developmental state, and welfare state.

Vetëvendosje is the largest political movement in Kosovo, having won 58 seats in the 2021 Kosovan parliamentary election together with Vjosa Osmani's Guxo! list, which ran inside Vetëvendosje's list. It is in government in coalition with the non-Serb minorities. Vetëvendosje's leader Albin Kurti serves as the Prime Minister of Kosovo. At the local level, Vetëvendosje governs with four municipalities. Additionally, Vetëvendosje's center in Albania, which functions as a nonprofit organization there, supported three independent candidates that were running in the 2021 Albanian parliamentary election.

History
Vetëvendosje was founded in 2005 as a successor of the Kosova Action Network (KAN), a group promoting active citizenry and direct political participation of the masses. KAN was founded in 1997 by a group of international activists that supported the 1997 student protests in Kosovo against the occupation of the campus of the University of Pristina by the Yugoslav Police. During the Kosovo War, KAN participated in documenting war crimes and during 1999 and 2000 KAN campaigned for the release of Albanian prisoners of war. In 2003, KAN moved its headquarters to Kosovo.

On 10 June 2004, 1000 KAN activists protested against the United Nations Interim Administration Mission in Kosovo (UNMIK), calling UNMIK an undemocratic regime and a criminal organization. KAN considered UNMIK an occupier of Kosovo that was denying Kosovo its right for independence, as well as leading it to economic and social erosion. In other activities, KAN activists opposed to the decentralization of local government along ethnic lines and demanded the return of the bodies of missing persons from the Kosovo war irrespective of ethnicity.

On 12 June 2005, KAN activists wrote the slogan "Jo Negociata - VETËVENDOSJE!" (Albanian for "No negotiations - SELF-DETERMINATION!") on the walls of UNMIK, marking the official transformation of KAN to Vetëvendosje. This was followed by the creation of Vetëvendosje centers in most municipalities of Kosovo and in countries with a significant Albanian diaspora. On 25 July 2005, Vetëvendosje activists distributed copies of the UN Resolution 1514 in front of the UNMIK headquarters. This was followed by other activities against UNMIK, which Vetëvendosje saw as an organization that did not represent the interests of the people of Kosovo. Vetëvendosje wanted independence for Kosovo based on the rights of the people for self-determination, which, according to Vetëvendosje, was guaranteed by the UN Resolution 1514. Among the targets of Vetëvendosje activists were vehicles of UNMIK with UN signs, to which the activists added an F character at the beginning and a D character at the end resulting in FUND signs, which in Albanian means The End. Vetëvendosje also organized protests in front of the headquarters of the United Nations in both New York and in Kosovo during the visits of the heads of state of Serbia or negotiations' mediators. Vetëvendosje activists threw rotten eggs at Boris Tadić, the president of Serbia, when he visited Kosovo. They also put red paint on the streets leading to the presidential residence of Kosovo when Martti Ahtisaari visited Kosovo, as a symbol for the blood spilled in the Kosovo war, which, according to Vetëvendosje, Ahtisaari was walking over with his plan.

On 10 February 2007 Vetëvendosje organized a large demonstration against the Ahtisaari Plan and the process of decentralization. The demonstration was attended by more than 60,000 people and took place in the streets of Pristina. Riot police were deployed after the rioters allegedly planned to storm the government offices. Following this deployment, clashes between the UNMIK riot police and the protesters started. The UNMIK police fired tear gas and rubber bullets at the crowd, which resulted in chaos. The Romanian UNMIK police officers killed two of the protesters by shooting them on the face with out-of-date rubber bullets. The first protester was killed while being part of the crowd, while the second protester was hiding from the tear gas inside Hotel Iliria when he got shot on the head. Apart from the two deaths, the protest resulted in an additional seven serious injuries and 73 minor injuries. One protester who was shot next to the heart survived after a long state of coma and had to live with the projectile inside his chest until his natural death in 2020. A UNMIK internal investigation revealed that the protesters got killed by out-of-date rubber bullets that were fired from 10 of the Romanian members of the police force, but declined to file charges because it was unclear who had fired the fatal shots. On the other hand, the leader of Vetëvendosje, Albin Kurti, got arrested and charged with three offences: leading masses of people believed to have committed criminal offences, calls for resistance, and disruption of police measures. In 2010, an EULEX judge sentenced him to 9 months in prison, but given that he had already spent 5 months in custody and another 5 in house arrest, he got released.

On 25 August 2009 Vetëvendosje organized protests in Pristina that turned violent, destroying 28 EULEX vehicles, one rioter and three police officers wounded.

In March 2016, activists of Vetëvendosje overturned two trucks carrying Serbian goods in a protest against the Serbian decision not to accept Kosovo Albanian schoolbooks in the Albanian-inhabited Preševo Valley in southern Serbia.

Mergers with other parties
The New Spirit Party merged into Vetëvendosje on 31 March 2011. The leader of New Spirit Party, Shpend Ahmeti became vice-chairman of Vetëvendosje and he won the local elections in Prishtina in 2013. He would go on to get re-elected as mayor of Prishtina in 2017, before leaving Vetëvendosje soon after elections to join the Social Democratic Party of Kosovo (PSD) in early 2018.

The Socialist Party of Kosovo, led by Ilaz Kadolli, joined Vetëvendosje on 26 April 2013. Kurti and Kadolli agreed that the merger will be in the interest of building a strong political and economical state. The party had no representatives in the Kosovo Parliament, but had several in local governments.

The People's Movement of Kosovo (LPK), with its structures in Kosovo and abroad joined Vetëvendosje on 23 July 2013, as stated from both leaders Kurti and Zekaj during the press conference in Vetevendosje headquarters in Prishtina: "...with the only aim to change social flow on the benefit of Albanian people". Zekaj stated that LPK had a wide membership within Kosovo and abroad, though he didn't provide numbers. LPK started in 1982 as a Marxist nationalist grouping of Albanian diaspora organizations in Western Europe and is considered the origin of the KLA. Most of its leadership moved on with the newly created party Democratic Party of Kosovo of Hashim Thaçi after the war.

Party platform
Vetëvendosje has been described as centre-left and left-wing that bases its program on three main axes: meritocracy, developmental state, and welfare state. Vetëvendosje supports the free market economy with an active role of the state through ownership of key industries, export promotion and import substitution. Meritocracy, alternatively called justice state by Vetëvendosje, consists of radical transparency, checks and balances, as well as separation of powers and no interference from the government in justice. Finally, the welfare state is supposed to ensure equality of outcomes, and not just opportunities, which is achieved through progressive taxation and protection of minorities and vulnerable groups. Furthermore, Vetëvendosje adheres to Albanian nationalism and populism in its policies regarding Kosovo's future, relations with Albania and ethnic Albanians in the Balkans and the wider diaspora. It is considered as the leading nationalist party in the contemporary Albanian world, and has advocated for the protection of the Albanians in Presevo Valley and North Macedonia as well as a referendum on possible unification of Kosovo with neighbouring Albania.

Justice state
The first pillar of Vetëvendosje's political program is the justice state, through which Vetëvendosje seeks to change legislation, combat corruption and increase citizens' trust on the state institutions. Vetëvendosje wants to amend Kosovo's constitution and to remove, among others, the parts that derive from the Ahtisaari Plan, UNMIK regulations, and Yugoslav legislation. It additionally strives to ensure clear independence for the judiciary and introduce more checks and balances.

Anti-corruption is one of the pillars of the justice state according to Vetëvendosje. It wants to take concrete steps to combat corruption by passing the Law for the Confiscation of Illegal Wealth, the Anti-mafia Law, as well as the Anti-corruption law, which, among others, would enable the courts to confiscate illegally-earned wealth irrespective of when or where it was earned, as well as investigate the connection of organized crime to the government and abuse by the public administration.

Developmental state
The second pillar of Vetëvendosje's program is the developmental state model. Through the developmental state, Vetëvendosje seeks to develop the economy of Kosovo through fiscal and monetary policies, as well as development of the agriculture, industry and education.

Vetëvendosje strives to implement progressive taxation on income and sales, as well as introduce changes of the taxes on profits and property. The tax system would support the middle class and the poor, as well as companies that re-invest their profits. In addition, Vetëvendosje strives for Kosovo to have a common currency with Albania by abandoning the euro, which according to Vetëvendosje makes Kosovar exports expensive.

Vetëvendosje aims to develop agriculture by subsidizing it in accordance with EU directives and regulations, in order to make Kosovo independent in production of food and to combat unemployment. It additionally wants to support SMEs and public companies by subsidizing their access to finance through a state-owned development bank.

Vetëvendosje additionally seeks to increase the production of energy and ores by building a new coal-based power plant and revitalizing the Trepça Mines and by supporting related industries. It additionally wants to research green alternatives to energy production and to increase cooperation with Albania in the energy sector.

When it comes to education, Vetëvendosje aims to adopt the dual education system, which is mostly practiced in Germany, Austria and Switzerland, countries with significant Albanian diaspora. It sees the switch to the dual education system as necessary to increase the quality of education in general.

Welfare state
The welfare state is the third pillar of Vetëvendosje's political program. Vetëvendosje wants to combat income inequality, discrimination against women and against minorities. It wants to improve the provision of healthcare services by introducing health insurance based on the Bismarck Model.

Vetëvendosje wants to reform the labor law. It wants to allow fathers to take parental leave, which is allowed only for the mother by the current legislation. Vetëvendosje further seeks to limit working hours to 40 per week and to introduce severance payments for laid-off workers. It further wants to combat informal employment and to increase the power of workers' unions by changing the law on unions.

Other issues
Vetëvendosje opposes bilateral relations with countries that do not respect Kosovo's sovereignty, and wants to cooperate with all countries based on the principle of reciprocity. Vetëvendosje has continuously criticized Kosovo's position in its negotiations with Serbia, claiming that the dialogue should be based on conditions and reciprocity. Vetëvendosje wants Kosovo to condition the dialogue with Serbia returning the bodies of missing persons from the Kosovo war buried in mass graves in Serbia, Serbia paying war reparations to Kosovo, and the return of the stolen pension funds and artifacts of the Kosovo Museum. Vetëvendosje considers dialogue with Serbia without prior conditions unfair and harmful. Vetëvendosje wants Kosovo to first negotiate with its Serb minority and the European Union, and then to go to negotiations with Serbia, after reaching internal consensus. It also supports principles of direct democracy, and feminism.

Vetëvendosje has been described as a nationalist party, and they want to amend Kosovo's constitution to remove the third article, which forbids the unification of Kosovo with other countries. According to the leader of Vetëvendosje, Albin Kurti, Kosovo should be allowed to unify with Albania if the people express this will through a referendum.

Vetëvendosje considers the process of privatization of public companies  a corruption model, that contributed to increasing unemployment, ruining the economy, and halting economic development of the country.  It wants to dissolve the Kosovo Privatization Agency.

Vetëvendosje wants to introduce mandatory military conscription in Kosovo, based on EU and NATO standards. It seeks to arm Kosovo through cooperation with NATO and to join the alliance in the future.

Chairman of Vetëvendosje

Elections

Parliamentary elections
After five years of participating in Kosovo's political scene through protests and demonstrations, Vetëvendosje took the decision to participate in the 2010 Kosovan parliamentary election in its fifth anniversary as a political movement. After the decision was taken, Albin Kurti got arrested by EULEX in relation to the 10 February 2007 protest. Kurti would go on and get sentenced to 9 months in prison, but given that he had already spent 5 months in custody and another 5 in house arrest for the same case, he got released.

2010 parliamentary elections
In December 2010, Vetëvendosje participated in the national elections of 2010 in coalition with LB  and obtained 12.66% of the votes, which translated to 14 seats at the parliament. Local and international observers detected many irregularities, including a participation rate of 95% certain municipalities, which were strongholds of the PDK. Vetëvendosje and LDK contested the election results in three voting centers and the elections got repeated in three municipalities, leading to a slight increase in the vote share of Vetëvendosje. Vetëvendosje and LB ended their coalition on 20 September 2011, after disagreements on distribution of funds. The two MPs from LB left the Vetëvendosje parliamentary group, reducing it to 12 members.

2014 parliamentary elections
In the 2014 elections, Vetëvendosje received 13.59% (99,397 votes), remaining the third strongest political force in the Kosovo Assembly with 16 seats. Despite PDK's electoral victory, Vetëvendosje, along with the LDK-AAK-Nisma coalition, tried to thwart PDK by attempting to form a new government together. A decision by the Constitutional Court of Kosovo that deemed Isa Mustafa's election as Chairman of the Assembly of Kosovo unconstitutional, led to the breakup of the LDK-AAK-Nisma coalition and LDK joining a coalition with PDK, in which Isa Mustafa assumed the position of prime minister. This led to Vetëvendosje taking the role of leader of the opposition, with AAK and NISMA being part of it. The Vetëvendosje-led opposition was very aggressive, opposing the border demarcation between Kosovo and Montenegro and the formation of the Association of Serb Municipalities. LDK was accused of betraying the opposition and keeping PDK in power. The opposition organized massive demonstrations on the streets, and it used tear-gas to block meetings of the parliament.

2017 parliamentary elections
In the 2017 elections, Vetëvendosje received 27.49% (200,132 votes) making it the biggest political party in the Kosovo Assembly with 32 seats. In comparison to the 2014 elections, Vetëvendosje doubled in size. Despite being the biggest individual party and parliamentary group, Vetëvendosje remained behind the PANA coalition and remained in opposition. In 2018, 12 MPs left Vetëvendosje and created the Group of the Independent Deputies, which would later join the Social Democratic Party of Kosovo (PSD). In addition, Vetëvendosje MP Donika Kadaj-Bujupi rejoined AAK. This split reduced the Vetëvendosje parliamentary group to 19 seats.

2019 parliamentary elections
In the early elections of 2019 which were called due to the resignation of Prime Minister at the time Ramush Haradinaj, Vetëvendosje received 26.27% (221,001 votes), remaining the biggest political party in the Kosovo Assembly with 29 seats, despite its split one year prior to the elections. Its total number of votes increased by over 10% relative to the previous election, but due to a higher participation rate, it received a smaller share of seats in the assembly. Vetëvendosje formed a coalition with LDK in February 2020 after months of negotiations, with Albin Kurti becoming prime minister of Kosovo. After a disagreement about the handling of the COVID-19 pandemic, Kurti sacked the LDK minister Agim Veliu. In retaliation, LDK initiated a motion of no confidence against the Kurti government, which passed at the parliament and the Kurti government was overthrown. Apart from Veliu's sacking, LDK blamed Vetëvendosje for ruining Kosovo's relations with the US, after Kurti exchanged skirmishes with the US envoy for the Kosovo-Serbia dialogue, Richard Grenell. Vetëvendosje remained in opposition and Kurti with the former government ministers from Vetëvendosje could not return to the parliament because they had resigned before taking executive roles, leaving them out of Kosovo's institutional life until the next election.

2021 parliamentary elections
After the fall of the Kurti government, LDK, together with AAK, NISMA, the Serb List, and other minorities, formed a new government on 3 June 2020. The government was elected with 61 votes, which was the critical minimum required to form a government. In December 2020, the Constitutional Court deemed the LDK-led government illegal, because one of the 61 MPs that voted for it had been convicted for corruption, meaning that he had lost his valid mandate before voting for the government. This led to new elections, which were held on 14 February 2021. Vetëvendosje ran together with Guxo. Because of a conviction for setting off tear gas, Albin Kurti was not allowed to run for a seat at the parliament. Vetëvendosje won the elections and experienced a significant increase in its vote share, receiving 50.28% of the total votes. The common list of VV and Guxo gained 58 seats, with 51 for VV and 7 for Guxo. As two elected members of Guxo joined the government and Osmani was elected President, three of the Guxo seats went to the following names on the elected list, increasing VV number to 53. In April 2021, Adelina Grainca, former PDK deputy joined Vetëvendosje, increasing its number of MPs to 54.

Parliamentary election results

Local elections

2013 local elections
Vetëvendosje participated in the 2013 local elections, which marked Vetëvendosje's first ever participation in local elections. Shpend Ahmeti from Vetëvendosje won the elections in the capital Pristina over LDK leader and former mayor Isa Mustafa. Until then, Pristina was considered a LDK stronghold. Vetëvendosje managed to gain local assembly seats in most of Kosovo's municipalities, but it did not win any other mayoral race. Vetëvendosje failed to win local assembly seats in the following municipalities: Dragaš, Leposavić, Zvečan, Zubin Potok, Novo Brdo, Gračanica, Mamuša, Parteš, Klokot, and North Mitrovica. Overall, Vetëvendosje came fourth with a decrease in votes in comparison to the 2010 parliamentary election. A session of the party's General Council was called on December 15, 2013 which between other things discussed these results as well as necessary action in response to them. According to Shpend Ahmeti's words during an interview with Top Channel, there were also changes in the statute of Vetëvendosje, which came out of the General Council meeting.

2017 local elections
In the 2017 local elections, Vetëvendosje won in won three municipalities. Vetëvendosje won a second term in Pristina with Shpend Ahmeti and also won in Prizren with Mytaher Haskuka and in Kamenica with Qendron Kastrati. Prior to Vetëvendosje's victory, Prizren was ruled by PDK for 18 years and was called PDK's 'Jerusalem'. Shpend Ahmeti and Qendron Kastrati left Vetëvendosje in early 2018 after the split of the movement. In the summer of 2019, Agim Bahtiri, mayor of Mitrovica joined Vetëvendosje. After the resignation of mayor Agim Veliu, an extraordinary election was held in Podujeva on 29 November 2020. Vetëvendosje's Shpejtim Bulliqi won the election and is now the mayor of Podujeva until the regular 2021 election.

2021 local elections
Vetëvendosje participated in the 2021 local elections and won 4 municipalities and 193 municipal council positions.

Controversies

Madeleine Albright controversy
On 10 December 2012, US Ambassador Tracey Ann Jacobson accused Vetëvendosje of having sent a threatening letter to former State Secretary Madeleine Albright. Vetëvendosje officially replied four days later, stating that "they were amazed with the accusations, and Kurti never sent any letter to Mrs. Albright, but if someone had proof should make it available to the public". They explained that they had urged citizens of Kosovo to mail to companies which were racing for the privatization of PTK while explaining to them the harm that the privatization was causing the country's economy and the wrong practices applied during the process. Apparently, one of the runners was a consortium of Portugal Telecom with Albright Capital Management, which dropped out of the race in January 2013.

2013 protest controversy
On 27 June 2013, the movement organized a protest against the ratification of the agreement between Prime Minister of Kosovo Hashim Thaçi and Prime Minister of Serbia Ivica Dačić during the latest round of political negotiations between Pristina and Belgrade in Brussels hosted by Catherine Ashton. Vetëvendosje tried to block all entrances to the parliament building, in order to hinder the assembly members from entering, thus preventing the agreement for being ratified. The protest didn't succeed, and the agreement was voted from the majority of the assembly representatives. During the protest, U.S. ambassador Tracey Ann Jacobson resulted with an injury on her right arm while entering from a secondary entrance together with some assembly members. Although the video evidence showed no physical contact between protesters and ambassador, confirmed as well by LDK assemblyman Haki Demolli who entered the building together with the ambassador, the incident aggravated the already difficult relationship between the U.S. State Department and Vetëvendosje. The reaction was prompt, following the US embassy official statement, Vetëvendosje was criticized by Kosovo government instances, political factors, as well as public opinion. Even long-time supporter of Vetëvendosje, former OSCE ambassador Willim Walker, described the action as a "big mistake". According to Zëri newspaper, the U.S. State Department called Kosovo's ambassador Akan Ismajli in Washington, D.C.,  requiring official explanations, though no comments came from official sources within Kosovo. 

The reaction from Vetëvendosje was vague, with soon-to-be-gone Alma Lama being the first one to personally apologize to the U.S. ambassador. On 1 July 2013, Glauk Konjufca apologized to all foreign representatives visiting the Kosovo parliament on that day: "Specifically, there is the case of U.S. ambassador, but even other foreign representatives to whom we apologize in case they have experienced any unpleasant situation. But, analyzing the harm that the agreement causes, it sounded reasonable to us to act the way we did though I don't deny having possibly made some mistakes."
The overall positioning of Vetëvendosje was described by Shpend Ahmeti statement: "The protest was not violent, we didn't want anyone to get hurt, we are sorry if someone actually did, but the negative effects of the agreement overrun any side effects of the protest", adding "the government is trying to show us as anti-American, which we are not".

The deputy assistant of Secretary of State in the Bureau of European and Eurasian Affairs Philip Reeker, during his visit to Pristina a few days later, was harsh and very direct with Vetëvendosje, calling them "clowns who want to be violent". Vetëvendosje responded by calling Reekers' accusations as "unfair and non-democratic" and issuing a letter of complaint to the U.S. Department of State.

Other controversies
Vetëvendosje activists and politicians have often ignored and contested the symbols of the Republic of Kosovo, including the flag and anthem. Visar Ymeri, chairman of Vetëvendosje at the time, refused to stand up for the anthem when participating in a congress of the AKR in 2017. When asked about it, Ymeri said that he confused it for a melody of Beethoven. In an interview before the 2019 parliamentary elections, Albin Kurti, chairman of Vetëvendosje, said that "Of course that I will respect (the symbols of Kosovo) as Prime Minister. But keep in mind that I am chairman of Vetëvendosje and I also represent those values that are important to us. The (Albanian) anthem is not just Albania's, it belongs to all Albanians. As Albanians, we have many things in common, including the (Albanian) flag, history, and so on. The flag of Kosovo has no history and no value other than its geographical value. We know that (adopting this flag) was a mistake, but now we have no choice but to accept it."

See also
 Politics of Kosovo
 Unification of Albania and Kosovo
 Albanian nationalism

Further reading

Notes and references
Notes

References

External links

 
 Political Manifesto 16 pages :wikisource:Page:Vetëvendosje! political programme in english.pdf/1
 Political Manifesto (Albanian) 49 pages Page:KosovoVetëvendosje!Programi i shkurte.pdf/1 - Wikisource
 

Albanian nationalism in Kosovo
Albanian nationalist parties
Progressive Alliance
Direct action
Political parties established in 2004
Political parties in Kosovo
Social democratic parties in Kosovo